Catoctin in Yavapai County, Arizona, United States was a small gold mining camp. The camp was established circa 1902 and received a post office on December 29 of the same year. It is located on upper Hassayampa River, sixteen miles southeast of Prescott. Only a handful of mining buildings and homes were constructed and on average the town was home to about twenty people. The Catoctin and Climax mines were nearby. On July 15, 1920, the post office was closed.

References

Ghost towns in Arizona
Former populated places in Yavapai County, Arizona
Mining communities in Arizona